Melton Christian College (MCC) is a Christian school in Melton, Victoria, Australia, which houses grade Preps up to Year 12.

See also

 List of schools in Victoria
 Victorian Certificate of Education

References

External links

Nondenominational Christian schools in Melbourne
Buildings and structures in the City of Melton